The 2019–20 QMJHL season was the 51st season of the Quebec Major Junior Hockey League (QMJHL). The regular season began on September 19, 2019, and was scheduled to end on March 21, 2020. Due to the COVID-19 pandemic in Canada, the regular season was suspended on March 12, 2020 and cancelled five days later. 

The post-season was scheduled to begin following the regular season, in which sixteen teams would compete for the President's Cup and be crowned champions of the QMJHL. Due to the COVID-19 pandemic in Canada, the playoffs were cancelled.

Suspension and cancellation of regular season
On March 12, 2020, the league announced that the season has been suspended due to the COVID-19 pandemic in Canada. Five days later, on March 17, the league announced that the remainder of the regular season was cancelled. The final standings are based on points percentage.

Cancellation of playoffs and Memorial Cup
On March 23, 2020, the league announced that the playoffs have been cancelled due to the COVID-19 pandemic in Canada. The Canadian Hockey League announced that the 2020 Memorial Cup held in Kelowna, British Columbia was cancelled.

Final standings

Note: GP = Games played; W = Wins; L = Losses; OTL = Overtime losses; SL = Shootout losses; GF = Goals for; GA = Goals against; PTS = Points; x = clinched playoff berth; y = clinched division title; z = clinched Jean Rougeau Trophy

Eastern Conference

Western Conference

Scoring leaders
Note: GP = Games played; G = Goals; A = Assists; Pts = Points; PIM = Penalty minutes

Leading goaltenders
Note: GP = Games played; Mins = Minutes played; W = Wins; L = Losses: OTL = Overtime losses; SL = Shootout losses; GA = Goals Allowed; SO = Shutouts; GAA = Goals against average

Trophies and awards
President's Cup – Playoff Champions: Not Awarded
Jean Rougeau Trophy – Regular Season Champions: Sherbrooke Phoenix
Luc Robitaille Trophy – Team with the best goals for average: Sherbrooke Phoenix 
Robert Lebel Trophy – Team with best GAA: Moncton Wildcats

Player
Michel Brière Memorial Trophy – Most Valuable Player: Alexis Lafrenière, Rimouski Océanic
Jean Béliveau Trophy – Top Scorer: Alexis Lafrenière, Rimouski Océanic
Guy Lafleur Trophy – Playoff MVP: Not Awarded
Jacques Plante Memorial Trophy – Top Goaltender: Samuel Hlavaj, Sherbrooke Phoenix
Guy Carbonneau Trophy – Best Defensive Forward: Benoit-Olivier Groulx, Halifax Mooseheads/Moncton Wildcats
Emile Bouchard Trophy – Defenceman of the Year: Jordan Spence, Moncton Wildcats
Kevin Lowe Trophy – Best Defensive Defenceman: Adam McCormick, Cape Breton Eagles
Michael Bossy Trophy – Top Prospect: Alexis Lafrenière, Rimouski Océanic
RDS Cup – Rookie of the Year: Zachary Bolduc, Rimouski Océanic
Michel Bergeron Trophy – Offensive Rookie of the Year: Zachary Bolduc, Rimouski Océanic
Raymond Lagacé Trophy – Defensive Rookie of the Year: Samuel Hlavaj, Sherbrooke Phoenix
Frank J. Selke Memorial Trophy – Most sportsmanlike player: Jakob Pelletier, Moncton Wildcats
QMJHL Humanitarian of the Year – Humanitarian of the Year: Xavier Simoneau, Drummondville Voltigeurs
Marcel Robert Trophy – Best Scholastic Player: Rafaël Harvey-Pinard, Chicoutimi Saguenéens
Paul Dumont Trophy – Personality of the Year: Alexis Lafrenière, Rimouski Océanic

Executive
Ron Lapointe Trophy – Coach of the Year: Stéphane Julien, Sherbrooke Phoenix
Maurice Filion Trophy – General Manager of the Year: Jocelyn Thibault, Sherbrooke Phoenix

All-Star Teams 
First All-Star Team:
 Kevin Mandolese, Goaltender, Cape Breton Eagles
 Jordan Spence, Defenceman, Moncton Wildcats
 Justin Bergeron, Defenceman, Rimouski Océanic
 Alexis Lafrenière, Forward, Rimouski Océanic
 Egor Sokolov, Forward, Cape Breton Eagles
 Alexander Khovanov, Forward, Moncton Wildcats

Second All-Star Team:
 Samuel Hlavaj, Goaltender, Sherbrooke Phoenix
 William Villeneuve, Defenceman, Saint John Sea Dogs
 Adam McCormick, Defenceman, Cape Breton Eagles
 Félix Robert, Forward, Sherbrooke Phoenix
 Alex-Olivier Voyer, Forward, Sherbrooke Phoenix
 Jakob Pelletier, Forward, Moncton Wildcats

All-Rookie Team:
 Samuel Hlavaj, Goaltender, Sherbrooke Phoenix
 Isaac Belliveau, Defenceman, Rimouski Océanic
 Jacob Dion, Defenceman, Drummondville Voltigeurs
 Zachary Bolduc, Forward, Rimouski Océanic
 Zachary Dean, Forward, Gatineau Olympiques
 Zachary L'Heureux, Forward, Moncton Wildcats

See also
 List of QMJHL seasons
 2019 in ice hockey
 2020 in ice hockey
 2019–20 OHL season
 2019–20 WHL season
 2020 Memorial Cup

References

External links
 Official QMJHL website
 Official CHL website
 Official website of the Subway Super Series

Quebec Major Junior Hockey League seasons
Qmjhl
QMJHL